Safotibant (INN) also known by the research code LF22-0542 is a non-peptide bradykinin B1 antagonist. It displayed binding Ki values of 0.35 and 6.5 nM at cloned human and mouse B1 receptors, respectively, while having no affinity for either human, mouse, or rat B2 receptors at concentrations up to 10 μM. This means that LF22-0542 is at least 4000 times selective for the B1 receptor over the B2 receptor. Systemic administration of LF22-0542 inhibited acute pain induced by acetic acid, formalin, and a hot plate. It also reversed acute inflammatory pain induced by carrageenan, and persistent inflammatory pain induced by CFA. In a neuropathic pain model, LF22-0542 reversed the thermal hyperalgesia, but not the mechanical hyperalgesia.

References

Analgesics
Anti-inflammatory agents
Sulfonamides
Imidazolines